Derana Dream Star is a Sri Lankan reality television series by television channel TV Derana. Dream Star first season was started in 2008 as the first season of Derana Dream Star. By 2021 TV Derana has presented over 10 seasons of Dream Star since the beginning of 2008. The program name means "Way to be a star". Program is presenting in TV Derana Dream Star studio in Colombo, Sri Lanka. From season one to nine, the winner was elected by the SMS votes cast by the people and the program wasn't live, since season ten, the program has been turned into a live reality program, the winner is elected by the majority of people votes cast through the online.

In 2012 Derana Dream Star season IV was held and announced the new theme song of "Udawediya Male" (Raween Kanishka), on behalf of the Dream Star season IV. from the season I to IX the program was judged by three judges, but since the season X, four judges have been introduced to the board. Keerthi Pasquel, Samitha Mudunkotuwa, Umara Sinhawansa and Nadeeka Guruge have been representing the present judge board since 2021. The program includes workshops for the competitors in the program.

Dream Star is presenting few rounds to elect to the grand finale. Udesh Indula, Upekha Nirmani, Keshan Shashindra, Sasindu Wijesiri, M.G Danushka, Janith Iddamalgoda, Suneera Sumanga, Thanura Madugeeth Dissanayake, Falan Andrea and Dulanga Sampath are listed in order as the winners from season I to X.

Seasons

Dream Star season I (2008) 
Dream Star season I was started in the year 2008. Derana Dream Star season I final competition was held at the Sugathadasa Indoor Stadium Colombo, Sri Lanka. Udesh Indula won the first place in Dream Star season I. Milinda Sandaruwan was the first runner-up, while nilupuli dilhara was placed 2nd runner up. Nirosha Virajini, Rohana Bogoda and Keerthi Pasquel judged the contestants.

Dream Star season II (2010) 
Dream Star season II was started in the year 2010. Upekha Nirmani, 18 years old schoolgirl from Negombo created history as very first female winner of the Dream Star history. Nirosha Virajini, Rohana Bogoda and Keerthi Pasquel judged the contestants throughout the Dream Star season II. Derana Dream Star season II final competition was held at the Sugathadasa Indoor Stadium Colombo, Sri Lanka. Udesh Manoj from Galle was the first runner-up while Nimesh Chamika from Panadura was placed third in the Dream Star season II.

Dream Star season III (2011) 
Dream Star season III was started in the year 2011. Keshan Shashindra won the first place in Dream Star season III. Shanaka Udeesha from Gampola was the first runner-up, while manuja mahawattha was placed 2nd runner up. Nirosha Virajini, Rohana Bogoda and Keerthi Pasquel judged the contestants throughout the Dream Star season III. Derana Dream Star season III final competition was held at the Sugathadasa Indoor Stadium Colombo, Sri Lanka.

Dream Star season IV (2012) 
Dream Star season IV was started in the year 2012. "Udawediya Male" song was released as the theme song of Dream Star season IV. Sasindu Wijesiri won the first place in Dream Star season IV. Raween Kanishka was the first runner-up, while sithum nimantha placed 2nd runner up. Keerthi Pasquel, Chandrika Siriwardena and Nadeeka Guruge judged the contestants throughout the Dream Star season IV. Derana Dream Star season IV final competition was held at the Sugathadasa Indoor Stadium Colombo, Sri Lanka.

Dream Star season V (2014) 
Dream Star season V was started in the year 2014. M.G Danushka won the first place in Dream Star season V. Vishmitha Sachintha was the first runner-up, while Lahiru Prabath was placed third in the Dream Star season V. Keerthi Pasquel, Samitha Mudunkotuwa and Nadeeka Guruge judged the contestants throughout the Dream Star season V. Derana Dream Star season V final competition was held at the Sugathadasa Indoor Stadium Colombo, Sri Lanka.

Dream Star season VI (2015) 
Dream Star season VI was started in the year 2015. Janith Iddamalgoda won the first place in Dream Star season VI. Yashodha Priyadarshani was the first runner-up while Chithroo Patalee was placed third in the Dream Star season VI. Keerthi Pasquel, Samitha Mudunkotuwa and Nadeeka Guruge judged the contestants throughout the Dream Star season VI. Derana Dream Star season VI final competition was held at the Sugathadasa Indoor Stadium Colombo, Sri Lanka.

Dream Star season VII (2017) 
Dream Star season VII was started in the year 2017. Suneera Sumanga Dias won the first place in Dream Star season VII. Shalin Kaushalya was the first runner-up while Mahesha Sandamali was placed third in the Dream Star season VII. Keerthi Pasquel, Samitha Mudunkotuwa and Nadeeka Guruge judged the contestants throughout the Dream Star season VII. Derana Dream Star season VII final competition was held at the Sugathadasa Indoor Stadium Colombo, Sri Lanka.

Dream Star season VIII (2018) 
Dream Star season VIII was started in the year 2018. Thanura Madugeeth Dissanayake won the first place in Dream Star season VII. Raveen Tharuka was the first runner-up while Krishadee Ranathunga was placed third in the Dream Star season VIII. Keerthi Pasquel, Samitha Mudunkotuwa and Nadeeka Guruge judged the contestants throughout the Dream Star season VIII. Derana Dream Star season VIII final competition was held at the Sugathadasa Indoor Stadium Colombo, Sri Lanka.

Dream Star season IX (2020) 
Dream Star season IX was started in the year 2020. Falan Andrea  won the first place  in Dream Star season IX in 2020. Nuwandhika Senarathne was the first runner-up while Gihan Bandara was placed third in the Dream Star season IX in 2020. Keerthi Pasquel, Samitha Mudunkotuwa and Nadeeka Guruge judged the contestants throughout the Dream Star season IX. Derana Dream Star season IX final competition was held at the Maharagama youth center Maharagama, Sri Lanka.

Dream Star season X (2021) 
Dream Star season X was started in the year 2021. Dulanga Sampath won the first place in Dream Star season X in 2021. Anjalee Methsara was the first runner-up while Rajitha Bhanuka was placed third in the Dream Star season X in 2021. Keerthi Pasquel, Samitha Mudunkotuwa,Nadeeka Guruge and Umara Sinhawansha judged the contestants throughout the Dream Star season X. Derana Dream Star season X final competition was held at the Nelum Pokuna Mahinda Rajapaksa Theatre Colombo, Sri Lanka.

Dream Star winners

Dream Star winners and runner-up

See also 

 TV Derana
 Nuwandhika Senarathne

Notes

References

External links 

 Official Website
 Ada Derana
 TV Derana

Sri Lankan reality television series
Sinhala-language television
TV Derana original programming